The United Nations Stakes is a Grade I American Thoroughbred horse race for three-year-olds and older run over a distance of one and three-eighth miles on the turf held annually in July at Monmouth Park Racetrack in Oceanport, New Jersey. The event currently offers a purse of $600,000.

History
The inaugural running of the event was on 26 September 1953 at the Atlantic City Race Course in Mays Landing, New Jersey as an Invitational handicap event, The United Nations Handicap over the distance of  miles. The event was named after the intergovernmental organization United Nations with the idea to promote the internationalization of the sport of horse racing whereby foreign horses bred, owned and trained would compete against each other in the US. The event attracted eight entries - four were foreign bred, including the English-bred Royal Vale and Stan, Chilean-bred Iceberg II, Irish-bred Olympic View and the others were US Bred. The first running was won in track record time of 1:55 by Iceberg II, who was trained by future U.S. Racing Hall of Fame inductee Horatio Luro and ridden by Jorge Contreras.Later Iceberg II would be enthroned as US Champion Male Turf Horse for 1953.

Within the first few years the event with its impressive stakes gave turf racing a spotlight. After his victory in 1956, Career Boy's owner Cornelius Vanderbilt Whitney then decided to send his top two runners to run in the prestigious Prix de l'Arc de Triomphe at Longchamp Racecourse in Paris, France. Entered with stablemate Fisherman and with Eddie Arcaro riding, Career Boy finished fourth in the 1956 Arc to Ribot. Career Boy's 1956 performances earned him US Champion Male Turf Horse honors. 

In 1957 the event was won by Round Table which was his eighth straight victory in the midst of an eleven race winning streak that landed him US Champion Male Turf Horse honors. In 1958 a crowd of 26,444 witnessed a masterful ride by the future U.S. Racing Hall of Fame jockey Bill Shoemaker who rode Clem to a new course record in 1:54 to a half length victory over Round Table who carried 130 pounds. This was the first defeat on the turf track by Round Table.  Nonetheless, Round Table was crowned US Horse of the Year in 1958 even though Clem had defeated him three times during the year. In the 1959 renewal of the event Round Table was assigned a top weight of 136 pounds giving 14 to 22 pounds to his nine rivals. Round Table won the event becoming the first two time winner of the event. 

By early 1960s the event had become as a logical and natural place for international and top US turf runners to prepare for the Washington D.C. International which was considered as the forerunner to the Breeders' Cup Turf and the championship long distance turf race. The event was held in September and with NYRA holding the Man o' War Stakes in late October or early November the path to the Washington D.C. International was clear. Although the 1960 winner T.V. Lark did not run in the Washington D.C. International, he did manage to go on as a four-year-old and win that event the following year. The 1962 and 1963 winner Mongo also went on to win the prestigious Washington D.C. International and captured US Champion Male Turf Horse honors. 

From 1963 to 1971 the event had a profound bearing on who would be crowned US Champion Male Turf Horse. The 1964 US Champion Male Turf Horse, Irish-bred Turbo Jet II finished third to Western Warrior in the event,  but the following start he was victorious in the Man o' War Stakes. The 1964 second place finisher and 1965 winner Parka was crowned US Champion Male Turf Horse. The 1966 winner Assagai would also win the Man o' War Stakes was crowned US Champion Male Turf Horse. Assagai was also second to 1967 longshot winner Flit-to, and third was Fort Marcy who eventually was voted 1967 US Champion Male Turf Horse. Fort Marcy would run four times in the event finishing third three times before finally winning the event in 1970. However, Fort Marcy was not disgraced in defeat. The 1968 winner Dr. Fager who defeated Advocator and Australian champion Tobin Bronze was crowned
US Horse of the Year and the 1969 winner, the South African-bred Hawaii was chosen as US Champion Male Turf Horse. In 1970 Fort Marcy won the United Nations Handicap, four weeks later won the Man o' War Stakes at Belmont Park and in early November captured the Washington D.C. International for the second time and was crowned 1970 US Horse of the Year. The 1971 winner Run the Gantlet won the event on the soft track and in October also won the Man o' War Stakes and continued on to win the Washington D.C. International by six lengths. Run the Gantlet's 1971 performances earned him American Champion Male Turf Horse honors.

In 1973 when The American Graded Stakes Committee was founded by the Thoroughbred Owners and Breeders Association the event was immediately given the highest classification of Grade I. By the 1980s the event was scheduled to be run in summer usually in late July 
or August.

Through the 1970s and 1980s the event produced notable winners. The 1974 winner Halo went on to become twice the Leading sire in North America in the 1980s. The 1978 winner, the English-bred Noble Dancer II was superbly ridden by U. S. Triple Crown winning jockey Steve Cauthen by six lengths which continues to be the largest margin of victory in the event. Noble Dancer II became the third horse to be a dual winner of the event in 1979.

Entering the Breeders' Cup era the event continued to be a notable preparatory event. The 1986 winner as a three-year-old, Manila followed with wins in the Grade I Turf Classic at Belmont Park and Grade I Breeders' Cup Turf at Santa Anita Park and was crowned US Champion Male Turf Horse.

From 1990 through 1997, the event was known as the Caesars International Handicap with sponsorship from Caesars Atlantic City. From 1990 to 1993 the event held a Grade II classification. The 1989 US Champion Male Turf Horse, the English-bred Steinlen set a new track record in 1990 winning in 1:52 flat.

The Canadian-bred Sky Classic won the 1992 renewal and which culminated in him winning US Champion Male Turf Horse honors. Duel Breeders' Cup Mile winner Lure proved that he could also win at a longer distance in 1994. While the Brazilian three-year-old champion from 1992, Sandpit would become the fifth horse to win the event twice in 1996.

With the economic deterioration of the Atlantic City Race Course the event was not held in 1998 in a shortened meeting.  

In 1999, the event was moved to Monmouth Park and run over a longer distance of  miles.
The event was continued to be well supported stakes reaching $750,000 in 2003. 
In 2004 the conditions of the event were changed from handicap to stakes allowance and the name of the event was modified to the United Nations Stakes.

Notable winners in the 2000s include 2004 Breeders' Cup Turf winner Better Talk Now winning the event in 2005. English Channel won the event for the second time in 2007. He continued his excellent form and captured the GI Joe Hirsch Turf Classic Invitational Stakes and the Breeders' Cup Turf by 7 lengths at Monmouth Park.  English Channel was voted US Champion Male Turf Horse for 2007.

Kenneth and Sarah Ramsey's Big Blue Kitten was the eighth horse to win this event twice in 2015. Big Blue Kitten continued his fine form winning the G1 Joe Hirsch Turf Classic Stakes Those victories were key in Big Blue Kitten being chosen US Champion Male Turf Horse in 2015.

After many years being scheduled close to July 4th weekend, the event is now part of the Haskell Stakes race day card.

Records 

Time record: 
  miles –   2:10.81  Bigger Picture (2017) (Track record)
  miles –  1:52.00  Steinlen (GB)  (1990)

Margins:
 6 lengths  –  Noble Dancer II (GB) (1978)

Most wins by a jockey
 5 – Joe Bravo (2012, 2013, 2015, 2017, 2020)Most wins by a trainer: 6 – MacKenzie Miller (1966, 1969, 1973, 1974, 1981, 1984)Most wins by an owner: 4 – Rokeby Stables (1970, 1971, 1981, 1984)Most wins: 2 – Round Table (1957, 1959)
 2 – Mongo (1962, 1963)
 2 – Noble Dancer II (GB) (1978, 1979)
 2 – Manila (1986, 1987)
 2 – Sandpit  (BRZ) (1995, 1996)
 2 – English Channel (2006, 2007)
 2 – Presious Passion (2008, 2009)
 2 – Big Blue Kitten (2013, 2015)

WinnersNotes:'''

‡ Ran as a part of a field entry

† In the running of the event in 2001, With Anticipation finished first but after taking the lead in the upper stretch then drifted outward under left handed pressure impeding the progress of Senure, the second place finisher. After a stewards inquiry and a subsequent claim of foul, the stewards disqualified With Anticipation and placed him second. Senure was declared the winner.

See also
 United Nations Stakes top three finishers and starters
 List of American and Canadian Graded races

External links
 Ten Things You Should Know About the United Nations Stakes at Hello Race Fans

References

Open middle distance horse races
Horse races in New Jersey
Graded stakes races in the United States
Grade 1 turf stakes races in the United States
Recurring sporting events established in 1953
Monmouth Park Racetrack
Atlantic City Race Course
1953 establishments in New Jersey
Turf races in the United States